K/O Paper Products (also known as Kurtzman/Orci Paper Products) was an American television and motion picture production company founded by Alex Kurtzman and Roberto Orci c. 2004, after signing a deal with DreamWorks Pictures to rewrite the script of the 2005 film The Island.

History

Orci and Kurtzman began their writing collaboration on the television series Hercules: The Legendary Journeys, after being hired by Sam Raimi. They were also involved in the sister-series to Hercules, Xena: Warrior Princess. They sought to move to writing for a network-based television series, but found this difficult. After receiving a series of negative responses, they met with J. J. Abrams who was starting work on Alias at the time. The meeting went well, and resulted in them working on the series. They would go on to work together again on the Fox science fiction series Fringe where all three were listed as co-creators.

In 2003, the duo began writing their first feature project, the sequel of The Mask of Zorro, The Legend of Zorro for Columbia Pictures. Orci and Kurtzman received their break in writing for films in 2004, with the Michael Bay film The Island, for which they developed the spec script by Caspian Tredwell-Owen. When Kurtzman and Orci first met Bay, he asked the pair "Why should I trust you?", to which Orci replied "You shouldn't yet. Let's see what happens." While this was not an overwhelming success, they were brought back for Bay's following film – Transformers after producer Steven Spielberg asked them to come in for a meeting. The movie took $710 million at the box office. Orci's first credit solely as a producer came with the film Eagle Eye, where he worked once again alongside Kurtzman. He said in an interview with the magazine Extra that he had previously been involved in productions where the producers had writing backgrounds and had looked to them for help, and he was happy to provide that same support to the writers on Eagle Eye. The director of the film, D. J. Caruso, praised the duo saying that "What's unusually cool about them is that they have maintained the producer-writer power that they earned in television and carried that over into the feature film area, and that is extremely rare." Following their work on Eagle Eye, they were executive producers on the Sandra Bullock film, The Proposal.

Orci and Kurtzman were asked to write the script for a new Star Trek film, but initially turned it down despite Orci being a fan of the series. Orci suggested rebooting the timeline as seen previously in the films and television series, and adding the return of Leonard Nimoy as Spock from Star Trek: The Original Series. He considered the first two films in the reboot series to be the origin story for the crew, and that the third film would start where the crew was at the beginning of Star Trek: The Original Series. Orci felt that the relationship between the James T. Kirk and the younger Spock was reflective of the partnership of himself and Kurtzman, he said that "We didn't even realize we were writing about ourselves until we were halfway through the script, that was a little embarrassing.

As of June 2009, Star Trek was the biggest grossing film at the domestic box-office in the United States, resulting in a sequel being greenlit by the studio and Kurtzman and Orci being asked to write it. The studio set aside a larger budget for the sequel, which was revealed by Orci in an interview with TrekMovie.com. Orci ruled out the "hero quitting" staple of a second movie, which had featured in the Transformers sequel, saying that the crew of the Enterprise were committed and that type of story doesn't have to apply to all sequels. During the buildup to the film, called Star Trek Into Darkness, Orci was one of the production team who didn't give much away about the villain in the film and denied that Benedict Cumberbatch was to play Khan Noonian Singh.

The criticism of the sequel resulted in Orci posting controversial comments on a Star Trek fan site. In response to a fan upset over Into Darkness, Orci called him a "shitty fan". He later apologized and deactivated his Twitter account.

The company itself 
In 2004, Kurtzman and Orci launched his own production company, signing a first-look deal with DreamWorks Pictures to produce feature films for the studio, after doing a successful rewrite on three of its films, The Island, The Legend of Zorro and Mission: Impossible III. The studio successfully developed its first feature film, Eagle Eye in 2008.

In 2009, Bobby Cohen joined the company, becoming the CEO of its films division.

In 2010, it was announced that Kurtzman and Orci had signed a three-year development deal with 20th Century Fox Television, to produce its television shows for cable and networks, who came off from the success of Fringe, and the development of Hawaii Five-0 and Transformers: Prime.

Heather Kadin, who was formerly employee of Warner Bros. Television joined the company that same year, when she was becoming president of the television division.

In 2011, it attempted to move over its film unit from DreamWorks to Skydance Productions, but it failed. In 2012, the studio successfully signed a deal with Universal Pictures to produce its feature films.

In 2013, Fox announced that they will pick up its television series by Kurtzman and Orci, Sleepy Hollow.

Later that same year, Kurtzman and Orci confirmed that the studio's television division will move over from 20th Century Fox Television to CBS Television Studios, the studio who was responsible for their own Hawaii Five-0 series.

Breakup of the partnership
In April 2014, Orci and Kurtzman confirmed to Variety that they are no longer going to work together on film projects but will still collaborate on television. Kurtzman wanted to work on the Spider-Man film franchise, while Orci was linked to the directorial role for Star Trek 3. Orci confirmed later that year in July that he was not involved in the production of The Amazing Spider-Man 3 alongside Kurtzman. Orci and Kurtzman's K/O Paper Products continues to operate as a production company within CBS Television Studios, and has created the series Scorpion inspired by the life of Walter O'Brien for the 2014–15 season and Limitless was created for the 2015–16 season from the 2011 film.

Prior to the split of Kurtzman and Orci, the duo were lined up to write the third film in the new Star Trek series. In May 2014, Skydance and Paramount Pictures announced that Orci was to direct the third installment of the Star Trek reboot franchise, after Abrams moved on to direct Star Wars: The Force Awakens. This would have marked Orci's directorial debut, and he was to write the script alongside co-writers JD Payne and Patrick McKay. Due to his commitment to Star Trek 3, he dropped out of a new Power Rangers film in which he would have been executive producer. But on December 5, it was announced he would no longer be directing the Star Trek film. He remains credited as a producer on the film, and was replaced by Doug Jung and cast member Simon Pegg as the script writers after Orci's initial script was dropped. Orci was replaced as director by Justin Lin, who had previously directed films in The Fast and the Furious franchise.

Orci created Matador with the idea that the main character would be a "soccer player by day who is a spy by night", and called him a "Latin James Bond". The series was broadcast on the El Rey Network created by Robert Rodriguez. It was renewed for a second season shortly before the pilot was broadcast, which had been directed by Rodriguez. But following the production of the first season, the series was cancelled despite the earlier renewal. This decision was blamed on poor international sales.

Television only
On June 27, 2014, it was announced that Aaron Baiers, at the time was Director of TV development, will become the vice president of the TV division under Heather Kadin. In 2016, it was announced that Kurtzman and Orci were to dissolve their television partnership, thus rendering the company defunct.

Filmography

References 

Film production companies of the United States
Television production companies of the United States
Entertainment companies established in 2005
Entertainment companies disestablished in 2016
Companies based in Beverly Hills, California
Entertainment companies based in California